The 1960 North Carolina lieutenant gubernatorial election was held on November 8, 1960. Democratic nominee Harvey Cloyd Philpott defeated Republican nominee S. Clyde Eggers with 58.98% of the vote.

Primary elections
Primary elections were held on May 28, 1960.

Democratic primary

Candidates
Harvey Cloyd Philpott, former State Representative
 C. V. Henkel, State Senator
David M. McConnell

Results

Republican primary

Candidates
David E. Bailey
S. Clyde Eggers, former State Representative
Otha B. Batten

Results

General election

Candidates
Harvey Cloyd Philpott, Democratic
S. Clyde Eggers, Republican

Results

References

1960
Gubernatorial
North Carolina